Fine Gold is a 1989 Spanish drama film directed by José Antonio de la Loma and starring Ted Wass, Stewart Granger and Lloyd Bochner. It depicts the ongoing feud between two winemaking families.

Cast
 Jane Badler - Julia
 Lloyd Bochner - Don Pedro
 Stewart Granger - Don Miguel
 Andrew Stevens - Michael
 Ted Wass - Andre
 Simón Andreu
 Frank Braña
 José María Caffarel
 Tia Carrere
 Concha Cuetos
 Fernando Hilbeck
 Tony Isbert
 Robert Avard Miller
 Jack Taylor
 Ray Walston

References

External links

1989 films
1989 crime drama films
Spanish drama films
1980s English-language films
English-language Spanish films
1980s Spanish-language films
Films directed by José Antonio de la Loma
Films about wine
1989 multilingual films
Spanish multilingual films
1980s Spanish films